MiniGUI is a GUI system with support for real-time and embedded operating systems, and aims to be fast, stable, light-weight and cross-platform. It was first released under the GNU GPL in 1999, and has since offered a commercial version with more features, including support for operating systems other than Linux and eCos. MiniGUI has been widely used in handheld terminals, portable media players, and industry instruments.

History 
MiniGUI was started by Wei Yongming as a simple interface for a control system based on Linux. The project was developed independently under the GNU GPL until September 2002, when the developers founded Feynman Software Technology and began commercial marketing of the software.

In October 2003, MiniGUI was ported to μClinux and eCos.

Features 
 Support for many embedded operating systems, including Linux and its derivative μClinux, eCos, VxWorks, pSOS, ThreadX and Nucleus
 Support for embedded resources and as a result devices without file systems
 Compatibility with Windows resource file formats including icons and cursors.
 Skin support
 Support for many character sets, including ISO8859 and BIG5

References

External links 
 MiniGUI official website
 

Graphical user interfaces